Sanjay Pathak is a State Ex Minister of Madhya Pradesh, Government of Madhya Pradesh and three time MLA from Vijayraghavgarh constituency of Katni District in Madhya Pradesh State, India. Pathak and his family members are involved in multiple social and mythological activities and supporting society to grow as well encouraging the educational sector.

Political career
He was appointed minister of state from Madhya Pradesh on 1 July 2016 by CM Shivraj Singh Chouhan Cabinet. Former Katni Zilla (district) Panchayat President, Sanjay Pathak won the Madhya Pradesh Legislative Assembly Election 2008 from his constituency Vijayraghavgarh.

In the Madhya Pradesh Legislative Assembly Election 2008, he contested assembly elections for the first time in his life. He retained his seat in the 2013 Elections, though this time he won by very little margin of 950 votes against his rival Ms. Padma Shukla of BJP. He resigned from his seat in April 2014 and joined BJP and won the August By-Poll with a huge margin of 53397 votes. He was a Congress MLA from 2008 to 2014. He is elected 3 times MLA in Vijayraghavgarh Constituency.

References

External links
 Sanjay Pathak Homepage

Living people
Madhya Pradesh MLAs 2008–2013
People from Katni
State cabinet ministers of Madhya Pradesh
Bharatiya Janata Party politicians from Madhya Pradesh
Indian National Congress politicians
Madhya Pradesh MLAs 2013–2018
1970 births